Iniistius celebicus, the Celebes razorfish, is a species of marine ray-finned fish 
from the family Labridae, the wrasses. It is found in the  Pacific Ocean.  

References

celebicus
Taxa named by Pieter Bleeker
Fish described in 1856